Hatsalatladi is a village in Kweneng District of Botswana. It is located 40 km north of Molepolole. The population of Hatsalatladi was 609 as of the 2001 census.

References

Kweneng District
Villages in Botswana